Aces High Light Aircraft was a Canadian ultralight manufacturer, located in London, Ontario.

Well known for its Cuby line of light and ultralight aircraft, the firm ceased operations in the mid-1990s.

Aircraft

References

Defunct aircraft manufacturers of Canada
London, Ontario